WMYU-LP (99.7 FM, "My 100") is a radio station broadcasting a Contemporary Inspirational music format. Licensed to Ooltewah, Tennessee, United States, the station is currently owned by The Freedom Fund and features programming from USA Radio Network.

References

External links
 

MYU-LP
MYU-LP
Hamilton County, Tennessee